Child in Time is the debut album by British jazz rock band Ian Gillan Band, released in 1976. The album took its title from the Deep Purple song "Child in Time", a version of which appears on the LP. The album reached No. 36 on Swedish charts and No. 55 in UK.
 
This was Ian Gillan's first release after leaving Deep Purple, and former Deep Purple bassist Roger Glover is the album's producer.

Track listing
Side 1
 "Lay Me Down" (Ian Gillan, Ray Fenwick, Mark Nauseef, John Gustafson) – 2:55
 "You Make Me Feel So Good" (Gillan, Mike Moran, Dave Wintour, Bernie Holland, Andy Steele) – 3:41
 "Shame" (Gillan, Fenwick, Nauseef, Gustafson) – 2:47
 "My Baby Loves Me" (Gillan, Fenwick, Nauseef, Roger Glover) – 3:35
 "Down the Road" (Gillan, Fenwick, Nauseef, Gustafson, Glover) – 3:27

Side 2

 "Child in Time" (Ritchie Blackmore, Gillan, Glover, Jon Lord, Ian Paice) – 7:23
 "Let It Slide" (Gillan, Fenwick, Nauseef, Gustafson, Moran) – 11:41

Personnel
Ian Gillan Band
 Ian Gillan – vocals and harmonica
 Mike Moran – keyboards (Fender Rhodes, Hohner Clavinet, Hammond organ, ARP 2600, piano, ARP string ensemble)
 Ray Fenwick – guitars, slide guitar and vocals
 John Gustafson – bass guitar and vocals
 Mark Nauseef – drums and percussion

Additional musicians
 Roger Glover – synthesizer (ARP 2600), kalimba and vocals

Chart performance

References

External links 
 Ian Gillan Band - Child in Time (1976) album releases & credits at Discogs
 Ian Gillan Band - Child in Time (1976) album credits & user reviews at ProgArchives.com
 Ian Gillan Band - Child in Time (1976) album to be listened as stream on Spotify

1976 debut albums
Jazz fusion albums by English artists
Albums produced by Roger Glover
Ian Gillan albums